Jatun Mayu (Quechua hatun, jatun big, great, mayu river, "great river") is a Bolivian river in the Cochabamba Department, Esteban Arce Province, in the Anzaldo and Sacabamba Municipalities. Its waters flow to Laguna Angostura.

 
Upstream the river is called Challaque. Its direction is mainly north west as it flows along Challaque, Sacabamba, Matarani and Apillapa. Before reaching the town Cliza the name of the river changes to the Siches River  or Cliza River. It is the main tributary of Laguna Angostura.

References

Rivers of Cochabamba Department